PrimeGrid is a volunteer  computing project that searches for very large (up to world-record size) prime numbers whilst also aiming to solve long-standing mathematical conjectures. It uses the Berkeley Open Infrastructure for Network Computing (BOINC) platform. PrimeGrid offers a number of subprojects for prime-number sieving and discovery. Some of these are available through the BOINC client, others through the PRPNet client. Some of the work is manual, i.e. it requires manually starting work units and uploading results. Different subprojects may run on different operating systems, and may have executables for CPUs, GPUs, or both; while running the Lucas–Lehmer–Riesel test, CPUs with Advanced Vector Extensions and Fused Multiply-Add instruction sets will yield the fastest results for non-GPU accelerated workloads.

PrimeGrid awards badges to users in recognition of achieving certain defined levels of credit for work done. The badges have no intrinsic value but are valued by many as a sign of achievement. The issuing of badges should also benefit PrimeGrid by evening out the participation in the less popular sub projects. The easiest of the badges can often be obtained in less than a day by a single computer, whereas the most challenging badges will require far more time and computing power.

History

PrimeGrid started in June 2005 under the name Message@home and tried to decipher text fragments hashed with MD5. Message@home was a test to port the BOINC scheduler to Perl to obtain greater portability. After a while the project attempted the RSA factoring challenge trying to factor RSA-640. After RSA-640 was factored by an outside team in November 2005, the project moved on to RSA-768. With the chance to succeed too small, it discarded the RSA challenges, was renamed to PrimeGrid, and started generating a list of the first prime numbers. At 210,000,000,000
the primegen subproject was stopped.

In June 2006, dialog started with Riesel Sieve to bring their project to the BOINC community. PrimeGrid provided PerlBOINC support and Riesel Sieve was successful in implementing their sieve as well as a prime finding (LLR) application. With collaboration from Riesel Sieve, PrimeGrid was able to implement the LLR application in partnership with another prime finding project, Twin Prime Search (TPS). In November 2006, the TPS LLR application was officially released at PrimeGrid. Less than two months later, January 2007, the record twin was found by the original manual project. TPS has since been completed, while the search for Sophie Germain primes continues.

In the summer of 2007, the Cullen and Woodall prime searches were launched. In the Fall, more prime searches were added through partnerships with the Prime Sierpinski Problem and 3*2^n-1 Search projects. Additionally, two sieves were added: the Prime Sierpinski Problem combined sieve which includes supporting the Seventeen or Bust sieve and the combined Cullen/Woodall sieve. In the fall of the same year, PrimeGrid migrated its systems from PerlBOINC to standard BOINC software.

Since September 2008, PrimeGrid is also running a Proth prime sieving subproject.

In January 2010 the subproject Seventeen or Bust (for solving the Sierpinski problem) was added.
The calculations for the Riesel problem followed in March 2010.

Projects
, PrimeGrid is working on or has worked on the following projects:

321 Prime Search

321 Prime Search is a continuation of Paul Underwood's 321 Search which looked for primes of the form 3 · 2n − 1. PrimeGrid added the +1 form and continues the search up to n = 25M.

Primes known for 3 · 2n + 1 occur at the following n:
 1, 2, 5, 6, 8, 12, 18, 30, 36, 41, 66, 189, 201, 209, 276, 353, 408, 438, 534, 2208, 2816, 3168, 3189, 3912, 20909, 34350, 42294, 42665, 44685, 48150, 54792, 55182, 59973, 80190, 157169, 213321, 303093, 362765, 382449, 709968, 801978, 916773, 1832496, 2145353, 2291610, 2478785, 5082306, 7033641, 10829346, 16408818 

Primes known for 3 · 2n − 1 occur at the following n:
 0, 1, 2, 3, 4, 6, 7, 11, 18, 34, 38, 43, 55, 64, 76, 94, 103, 143, 206, 216, 306, 324, 391, 458, 470, 827, 1274, 3276, 4204, 5134, 7559, 12676, 14898, 18123, 18819, 25690, 26459, 41628, 51387, 71783, 80330, 85687, 88171, 97063, 123630, 155930, 164987, 234760, 414840, 584995, 702038, 727699, 992700, 1201046, 1232255, 2312734, 3136255, 4235414, 6090515, 11484018, 11731850, 11895718, 16819291, 17748034, 18196595

PRPNet projects

Accomplishments

AP26
One of PrimeGrid projects was AP26 Search which searched for a record 26 primes in arithmetic progression. The search was successful in April 2010 with the finding of the first known AP26:
 , or 23 primorial, is the product of all primes up to 23.

AP27
Next target of the project was AP27 Search which searched for a record 27 primes in arithmetic progression. The search was successful in September 2019 with the finding of the first known AP27:
 , or 23 primorial, is the product of all primes up to 23.

Cullen prime search
PrimeGrid is also running a search for Cullen prime numbers, yielding the two largest known Cullen primes. The first one being the 14th largest known prime at the time of discovery, and the second one was PrimeGrid's largest prime found  at over 2 million digits.

Generalized Fermat prime search
On 24 September 2022, PrimeGrid discovered the largest known Generalized Fermat prime to date, . It ranks as the 13th largest known prime overall.

Riesel Problem
, PrimeGrid has eliminated 18 values of k from the Riesel problem
and is continuing the search to eliminate the 43 remaining numbers. 3 values of k are found by independent searchers.

Twin prime search
Primegrid worked with the Twin Prime Search to search for a record-sized twin prime at approximately 58,700 digits. The new world's largest known twin prime  was eventually discovered on January 15, 2007 (sieved by Twin Prime Search and tested by PrimeGrid). The search continued for another record twin prime at just above 100,000 digits. It was completed in August 2009 when Primegrid found . Continued testing for twin primes in conjunction with the search for a Sophie Germain prime yielded a new record twin prime in September 2016 upon finding the number  composed of 388,342 digits.

Woodall prime search
, the project has discovered the four largest Woodall primes known to date.
The search continues for an even bigger Woodall prime.
PrimeGrid also found the largest known generalized Woodall prime,
.

Media coverage
PrimeGrid's author Rytis Slatkevičius has been featured as a young entrepreneur in The Economist.

PrimeGrid has also been featured in an article by Francois Grey in the CERN Courier and a talk about citizen cyberscience in TEDx Warwick conference.

In the first Citizen Cyberscience Summit, Rytis Slatkevičius gave a talk as a founder of PrimeGrid, named Finding primes: from digits to digital technology,
relating mathematics and volunteering and featuring the history of the project.

References

External links

 
PrimeGrid Discord chat server (almost daily discovery announcements)
PrimeGrid's results at The Prime Pages

Science in society
Free science software
Volunteer computing projects
Distributed prime searches
Cross-platform free software